Luka Slišković (born 4 April 1995) is a Swiss-Austrian footballer who plays as a forward for Schaffhausen.

Career
Slišković made his professional debut for 1. FC Magdeburg in the first round of the 2020–21 DFB-Pokal, starting against Darmstadt 98 before being substituted out in the 67th minute for Sirlord Conteh. The match finished as a 2–3 loss after extra time.

On 31 August 2022, his contract with Magdeburg was dissolved.

On 2 September 2022, Slišković returned to Switzerland and signed with Schaffhausen.

References

External links
 
 Luka Slišković at kicker.de
 
 
 Career statistics at SFL.ch

1995 births
Living people
People from Zofingen
Swiss men's footballers
Switzerland youth international footballers
Austrian footballers
Swiss people of Austrian descent
Swiss people of Serbian descent
Swiss expatriate footballers
Austrian expatriate footballers
Swiss expatriate sportspeople in Germany
Austrian expatriate sportspeople in Germany
Expatriate footballers in Germany
Association football forwards
FC Luzern players
FC Biel-Bienne players
FC Winterthur players
1. FC Magdeburg players
FC Schaffhausen players
Swiss Challenge League players
3. Liga players
Sportspeople from Aargau